The New Zealand Map Grid (NZMG) is a map projection based on the New Zealand Geodetic Datum 1949. It has now been replaced by the New Zealand Transverse Mercator 2000 projection, which is based on the New Zealand Geodetic Datum 2000 using the GRS80 reference ellipsoid.

This is the grid setting used for GPS in New Zealand.

See also
Surveying in New Zealand

References

Geography of New Zealand
Geographic coordinate systems